The 2022–23 season is the 116th in the history of S.P.A.L. and their third consecutive season in the second division. The club will participate in Serie B and Coppa Italia.

Players

Out on loan

Transfers

In

Out

Pre-season and friendlies

Competitions

Overall record

Serie B

League table

Results summary

Results by round

Matches 
The league fixtures were announced on 15 July 2022.

Coppa Italia

References 

S.P.A.L. seasons
SPAL